The 2013 Erbil bombings were five coordinated suicide car bombings attacks in the Iraqi Kurdistan capital, Erbil on 29 September 2013 . At least 6 people were killed in the attack and over 40 injured. The suicide attacks  happened at entrance an Asayesh headquarter and also near Iraqi Kurdistan ministry of Interior building.

References

See also 
 2004 Erbil bombings
 2005 Erbil bombing
 2021 Erbil missile attacks

2013 murders in Iraq
21st-century mass murder in Iraq
Mass murder in 2013
Al-Qaeda activities in Iraq
Suicide bombings in Iraq
Terrorist incidents in Iraq in 2013
September 2013 events in Iraq
Building bombings in Iraq
2013 in Iraqi Kurdistan
History of Erbil